Luan is the Mandarin pinyin and Wade–Giles romanization of the Chinese surname written  in simplified Chinese and  in traditional Chinese. Luan is listed 243rd in the Song dynasty classic text Hundred Family Surnames. As of 2008, it is the 226th most common surname in China, shared by 360,000 people.

Notable people
 Luan Bin (欒賓; 8th century BC), minister of Huan Shu of Quwo
 Luan Cheng (欒成; died 709 BC), son of Luan Bin, minister of the State of Jin
 Luan Zhi (欒枝; died 622 BC), son of Luan Cheng, general of Jin
 Luan Dun (欒盾; 7th century BC), son of Luan Zhi, general of Jin
 Luan Shu (欒書; died 573 BC), son of Luan Dun, general of Jin
 Luan Yan (欒黶; died 556 BC), son of Luan Shu, general of Jin
 Luan Zhen (欒鍼; died 559 BC), younger brother of Luan Yan, general of Jin
 Luan Ying (欒盈; died 550 BC), son of Luan Yan, revolted against Jin
 Luan Fang (欒魴; 6th century BC), the only survivor of the Luan clan after its failed rebellion against Jin
 Luan Shi (欒施; 6th century BC), minister of the State of Qi
 Luan Bu (欒布; died 145 BC), Han dynasty general
 Luan Da (died 112 BC), Han dynasty religious figure
 Luan Ba (欒巴; died 168 AD), Eastern Han eunuch
 Jujie Luan (born 1958), Chinese-Canadian female fencer, Olympic champion
 Luan Jin (born 1958), badminton player, world champion
 Luan Bo (born 1965), female skater and coach
 Luan Yijun (栾义军; 1967–2009), football player
 Luan Keyong (欒克勇; born 1970), Taiwanese songwriter
 Luan Zheng (born 1984), female handball player
 Luan Yunping (栾云平; born 1984), xiangsheng performer

References

Chinese-language surnames
Multiple Chinese surnames